Calcium inosinate is a calcium salt of the nucleoside inosine.  Under the E number E633, it is a food additive used as a flavor enhancer.

Calcium compounds
Flavor enhancers
Food additives
Nucleotides
Purines
E-number additives